José Crespo may refer to:

 José Crespo (rower) (born 1962), Spanish lightweight rower
 José Álvarez Crespo (born 1945), Mexican footballer
 José Ángel Crespo (born 1987), Spanish footballer
 José Antonio Crespo (born 1977), Spanish badminton player
 José Crespo (actor) (1900–1997), Spanish film actor
 José Manuel Crespo (born 1972), Spanish sprint canoer
 José Manuel Colmenero Crespo (born 1973), Spanish footballer